Clyde Hart (1910 – March 19, 1945) was an American jazz pianist and arranger. He was an important figure in the transition from swing to bebop.

Life and career
Hart was born in Baltimore, Maryland, in 1910. He started his career as a professional jazz pianist in 1929 when he joined Gene Coy's ensemble. He was also part of Jap Allen's band from 1929 to 1931. Hart played piano in Blanche Calloway's big band from 1931 to 1935 and was based in New York City from 1936.

In the late 1930s, he played with Lionel Hampton and Chu Berry. In the first half of the 1940s he played with John Kirby, Roy Eldridge and Hot Lips Page, among others. In the last few months of his life, Hart performed with some of the most important figures of the bebop era, such as Charlie Parker, Dizzy Gillespie and Don Byas, and led recording three sessions. He died of tuberculosis in New York City in March 1945, at the age of 35.

Discography
 Roy Eldridge, Arcadia Ballroom 1939 Arcadia Shuffle (Jazz Archives, 1973)
 Charlie Parker, The Immortal Charlie Parker (Savoy, 1955)
 Joe Guy & Hot Lips Page, Trumpet Battle at Minton's (Xanadu, 1975)
 Ben Webster, Ben and the Boys (Jazz Archives, 1976)
 Ben Webster, The Horn (Circle, 1982)

References

External links
Savoy Records Discography: 1931–1944. Jazzdisco.

1910 births
1945 deaths
Musicians from Baltimore
American jazz pianists
American male pianists
American music arrangers
Bebop pianists
20th-century deaths from tuberculosis
20th-century American pianists
Jazz musicians from Maryland
20th-century American male musicians
American male jazz musicians
Tuberculosis deaths in New York (state)